Dillwynia pungens is a species of flowering plant in the family Fabaceae and is endemic to the south coast of Western Australia. It is an erect, spindly shrub with cylindrical leaves and yellow flowers with red or orange markings.

Description
Flowering occurs from August to November.

Taxonomy and naming
This species was first formally described in 1827 by Robert Sweet in his book Flora Australasica and was given the name Eutaxia pungens. In 1837, George Bentham changed the name to Dillwynia pungens in the Commentationes de Leguminosarum Generibus. The specific epithet (pungens) means "ending in a sharp point", referring to the leaves.

Distribution
This dillwynia grows on rocky slopes and ridges in the Esperance Plains and Mallee biogeographic regions on the south coast of Western Australia.

Conservation status
Dillwynia pungens is classified as "not threatened" by the Government of Western Australia Department of Parks and Wildlife.

References

pungens
Eudicots of Western Australia
Taxa named by Robert Sweet (botanist)
Plants described in 1827